Graeme Cameron is a former association football player who represented New Zealand at international level.

Career
Cameron played two official A-international matches for the New Zealand in 1990, both against China, the first in a 2–1 win on 16 August, the second a 1–0 win on 24 August 1990.

References

External links
 

Year of birth missing (living people)
Living people
New Zealand association footballers
New Zealand international footballers
People educated at Kelston Boys' High School
Association football forwards